Aureliano Chaves (13 January 1929 – April 30, 2003) was a Brazilian politician.

Born in Três Pontas, state of Minas Gerais, he was a Representative of this state in the Chamber of Deputies in 1967 from the ARENA party. He was selected as the governor of Minas Gerais state from 1975 to 1978 and was elected vice-president in 1979 under João Baptista de Oliveira Figueiredo. He acted as president during Figueiredo's health crisis in 1981 and 1983.

After the democratization of Brazil, he ran unsuccessfully for the presidency of Brazil. After the elections of 1989 he retired from politics.

See also
List of Governors of Minas Gerais

References 

1929 births
2003 deaths
People from Minas Gerais
National Democratic Union (Brazil) politicians
National Renewal Alliance politicians
Democratic Social Party politicians
Democrats (Brazil) politicians
Vice presidents of Brazil
Energy ministers of Brazil
Members of the Chamber of Deputies (Brazil) from Minas Gerais
Governors of Minas Gerais
Members of the Legislative Assembly of Minas Gerais
Candidates for President of Brazil
Candidates for Vice President of Brazil